HR 40 may refer to

 HD 895, a star system in the Andromeda constellation, also designated as HR 40
 Commission to Study and Develop Reparation Proposals for African-Americans Act, a proposed act to investigate potential reparations for slavery in the United States, introduced as H.R. 40